Caldari   is a frazione of the municipality of Ortona in the Province of Chieti in Abruzzo, Italy.

Some families that originate from Caldari include the DiIenno, Dragani, Tenaglia, Petrangelo, D'Annible, Gaeta, Mennicucci, Di Ienno, Di Nunzio, Natale, Vedilei, Cieri and  Nasuti families. 

Frazioni of the Province of Chieti